Trenten Merrill (born May 18, 1990) is an American Paralympic athlete who specializes in long jump. He represented the United States at the 2016 and 2020 Summer Paralympics. Merrill's right foot was amputated after a dirt bike accident.

Career
Merrill represented the United States at the 2016 Summer Paralympics in the men's long jump T44 event and finished in fourth place with an American Record of 6.84-metres.

He represented the United States at the 2019 Parapan American Games where he won a gold medal in the long jump T63/T64 event.

Merrill represented the United States at the 2020 Summer Paralympics in the men's long jump T64 event and won a bronze medal.

Personal life
In March 2005 he and a friend were riding in tandem on a dirt bike when they were involved in a collision with a car, and Merrill's right foot was pinned between the dirt bike and car. He had five surgeries to repair the foot, however, it had to be amputated as blood was no longer circulating in his foot after transmission fluid had spilled into the wound during the accident. When not competing in athletics, he is also a model.

References

1998 births
Living people
People from Laguna Niguel, California
American male long jumpers
American amputees
Medalists at the 2019 Parapan American Games
Paralympic track and field athletes of the United States
Athletes (track and field) at the 2016 Summer Paralympics
Athletes (track and field) at the 2020 Summer Paralympics
Medalists at the 2020 Summer Paralympics
Paralympic bronze medalists for the United States
Paralympic medalists in athletics (track and field)
Track and field athletes from California
Saddleback College alumni
College men's track and field athletes in the United States
Azusa Pacific Cougars athletes